Hoole is a surname, and may refer to:

 Daryl Hoole (born 1934), American author and public speaker
 Elijah Hoole (1798–1872), English Wesleyan Methodist missionary, father of the architect of the same name
 Elijah Hoole (architect) (1837–1912), English architect, son of the missionary of the same name
 John Hoole (1727–1803), English translator
 Ken Hoole (1916–1988), English railway historian
 Rajan Hoole, Tamil human rights activist
 Ratnajeevan Hoole (born 1952), electrical engineering academic

See also
Hoole (disambiguation)
Hooley (surname)

Surnames
Surnames of British Isles origin
Surnames of English origin
English-language surnames
Toponymic surnames